Sergey Ostroshapkin (born 28 April 1976) is a Belarusian boxer. He competed in the men's lightweight event at the 1996 Summer Olympics. At the 1996 Summer Olympics, he lost to Denis Zimba of Zambia.

References

1976 births
Living people
Belarusian male boxers
Olympic boxers of Belarus
Boxers at the 1996 Summer Olympics
Place of birth missing (living people)
Lightweight boxers
20th-century Belarusian people